Mount Kembla  is a suburb and a mountain in the Illawarra region of New South Wales, Australia.

The suburb, a semi-rural township of Wollongong, gets its name from the mountain, located on the Illawarra escarpment, is derived from an Aboriginal word, kembla, meaning "plenty of game". The satellite localities of Kembla Heights, Windy Gully, Cordeaux Valley and Kembla Village are comprised within the suburb of Mount Kembla that at the  had a population of 1,068.

The area surrounding Mount Kembla is a coal mining area, notable for the Mount Kembla Mine disaster of 1902 in which 96 people lost their lives.

Mount Kembla suburb
The suburb of Mount Kembla and its associated "main" village includes a local primary school, church and graveyard, several hundred houses and the Mount Kembla Hotel, which was built in 1896. The general store/post office closed in 2010, making it the first time in 145 years the village has been without one. The village also has a heritage centre showcasing local history, emphasizing the mining disaster. An annual Heritage Festival and 96 Candles Ceremony, commemorating the victims of the mine disaster, have been performed consistently every year since the disaster. The village is accessible from Wollongong, via Cordeaux Road, named after early settlers; and from Mount Keira via Harry Graham Drive. The small village of Kembla Heights is to the northwest, reached by Harry Graham Drive.

The Mount Kembla Colliery was established in 1883, and the purpose-built township was constructed by the company to house the employees. The community thrived until late-1970 when the mine closed and the town went into decline, losing its general store, post office, Presbyterian church, tennis courts and public telephones during the following years.

South32 is currently mining at the Dendrobium site, half a kilometre west of the village. Mount Kembla is joined to the west by the Illawarra escarpment and, in particular, a mass with two lower summits, Kembla West (512 m) and Mount Burelli (531 m). The mountain forms a prominent peak pointing approximately eastward.

Mine disaster
On 31 July 1902 the Mount Kembla Colliery exploded, killing 96 men and boys. The Mount Kembla Mine disaster was the second worst post-settlement peace-time disaster of Australia's history (behind Cyclone Mahina), until the 2009 Black Saturday bushfires in Victoria.

The mine
The coal was worked through a drift mine with additional adits for ventilation and drainage. There are two main haulage roadways. The "Main Tunnel" roadway extends from the entrance in a north-westerly direction. The other main haulage way is called "No. 1 Right" and branches off the main tunnel  in from the mouth. No. 1 Right runs due north. Branching off No. 1 Right are other passageways named "First Right", "Second Left" and so forth. The "Eastern District" is at the end of No 1 Right and this is where the explosion occurred.

The mine was originally ventilated by return roads to the entrance and a furnace there. A furnace at the foot of the shaft drove the ventilation. The original return roads had then been converted to intakes and were used as travelling roads.

A quote from the mine manager, William Rogers, stated that the mine was "absolutely without danger from gases", the Illawarra Mercury reported that "gas had never been known to exist in the mine before" and The Sydney Morning Herald recorded "one of the best ventilated mines in the State".

Bulli had been the site of a fire-damp and coal-dust explosion which had killed 81 people in 1887. Over four pages the commission summarised around 20 incidents of fire-damp which were reported to them. As a result of the evidence produced the commission tested parts of the mine themselves and found gas being given off "in several widely distant parts of the mine". They accepted that under normal circumstances the ventilation would deal with the problem but "This result ... leads the Commission irresistibly to the conclusion ... that, given favourable conditions for accumulation, a dangerous collection might be found in almost any part of the workings".

All the coal had been removed and the resulting space was termed a "goaf". When the props were withdrawn the roof was allowed to fall into the goaf.

The disaster
At around 14:00 on 31 July 1902 a large amount of flame and smoke burst from the main tunnel, along with a loud noise. Other adits had smoke driven out from them. 261 men were underground at the time, but after the blast some of them managed to find their own way out.

The Royal Commission produced a summary of their findings about the cause and mechanism of the disaster. A roof fall in the 4th Right goaf drove out a considerable amount of a fire-damp/air mixture. The mixture passed along the 4th Right road crossing the No. 1 Right traveling road and bursting through the canvas doors into No 1 Right haulage road. As the mixture travelled it raised coal dust which was carried with it.  The mixture started to travel outbye before being stopped by the ventilation air current and forced back inbye. Some of the gas travelled ahead of the main pocket further inbye where it met the naked light used by a wheeler at the 4th Left junction. Once strong enough to ignite it flashed back along the haulage road to the main body of the gas. The fire-damp/coal-dust/air mixture then exploded. The force of the explosion raised more coal-dust leading to further explosions until the flame was seen to come out of the entrance.

The explosions "wrecked a large portion of the mine" and killed some miners. The incomplete combustion of the coal-dust resulted in the production of carbon monoxide, or after-damp. The after-damp was responsible for the majority of the deaths.

During the explosion the shaft district, where the ventilation furnace was, was not affected.  The furnace continued to draw air through the mine and clear the after-damp. Since all drifts and adits were intakes the rescuers were able to enter the mine as the after-damp cleared.  They were further hindered by roof falls caused by the explosion. Two of the rescuers, Mr H. O. MacCabe and William McMurray, pushed ahead too fast and were killed by the after-damp.

Inquiries
The day following the explosion the coroner at Wollongong opened an inquiry into the cause of death of the first of the miners brought out.  Over the period from 1 August to 12 September 1902 the inquest sat on 22 days hearing evidence from 28 witnesses and visiting the mine. The Jury returned a verdict that the Meurant brothers and William Nelson "came to their death … from carbon monoxide poisoning produced by an explosion of fire-damp ignited by the naked lights in use in the mine, and accelerated by a series of coal-dust explosions starting at a point in or about the number one main level back headings, and extending in a westerly direction to the small goaf, marked 11 perches [] on the mine plan."

A royal commission concerning the disaster was appointed on 6 November 1902 and held hearings in March, April and May 1903. The commission came to a different verdict from the coroner's jury. In the first place they queried the meaning of "accelerated by a series of coal-dust explosions" pointing out that the coal-dust explosions were part of the initial blast and not a factor coming into play some time later. The commission then disagreed over the seat of the explosion, placing it at the junction of the 4th Right road and the No. 1 Haulage road, whereas the Coroner's jury had placed it at number one main level back headings.

Once the commission had decided that the likely cause of the explosion was the expulsion of fire-damp from the 4th Right goaf they considered whether blame could or should be attached to any person or persons. Rule 10 of the mine required the inspection weekly of the state of waste workings. This was not being done. The inspections that were done looked at the state of the roof which was being allowed to fall. No testing for gas seems to have occurred, in part because the roof was highly unstable. The commission concluded that no normal testing would have revealed the gas accumulation in the roof of the goaf.

Rather than holding any individual official of the Mount Kembla Company responsible, the Commission stated that only the substitution of safety lamps for flame lights could have saved the lives of the 96 victims. However, flame lights continued to be used well into the 1940s.

Aftermath
Some of the dead were buried in Mount Kembla's village cemetery, which also contains a -tall memorial to the disaster, listing the names of the miners and two rescuers who perished.

History
Local Aboriginal legends told of Mount Kembla and Mount Keira being sisters and the Five Islands being daughters of the wind. The first European to observe the mountain was Captain James Cook on his voyage from Whitby. While navigating the east coast of Australia, he noted it as 'a round hill', its top resembling a hat. The village was first settled in 1817 by George Molle.

Two old pit-pony watering holes on the ring track are still visible, as are the remains of an intended carriageway to the top (suspended in the 19th century and never completed) to the north of the Summit Track. On the eastern part of the Ring Track there are two mine entrances. Lantana weed has become a problem in the bushland of Mount Kembla, as have feral goats and deer.

During European times Mount Kembla has had a very significant role in mining industry. Mount Kembla is noted as being the home of the first kerosene mine in Australia. This mine was located near American Creek on land owned by John Graham, who remained one of the proprietors once mining operations commenced in mid July 1865. Coal mining has been the main industry in the area and continues presently with Dendrobium Mine still operating.

In addition to mining, Mount Kembla has a significant agricultural history; in particular the Cordeaux Valley area which was one of Australia's top fruit growing industries, exporting as far away as London in its hey day as one of the country's best apples producers.

Notable people
Mount Kembla is known for producing or attracting creative people; painters, poets, writers, photographers and history buffs are inspired by the area. Notable people include:
 Wendy Richardson , a playwright
 John McNamara , a poet and historian
 Fred Moore, a miner and activist.

Geography

Mount Kembla is joined to the sandstone cliffs of the Illawarra escarpment, overlooking Wollongong. The mountain has a unique collection of flora, being the fusing point for northern and southern types of eucalypt growth and containing many types of rainforest. It also has two orchards on the western slope. American Creek flows down the mountain, past the mine and village. It has a summit plateau divided into two sections, the higher one raised slightly above the west one, forming a small rise at the top. The ridge descends from the plateau and the mountain is generally quite thin at the top, widening below to create foothills that extend into the outer western suburbs of Wollongong and Unanderra. Many high trees are to be found there and pockets of rainforest grow about Dapto Creek and American Creek. American Creek flows to the north of the mountain from the joint to the escarpment and Dapto Creek from the southern side. A prominent foothill is at its southeast side, which juts out above farmland.

Mount Kembla forms part of the Illawarra Escarpment State Conservation Area, which stretches from Stanwell Park in the north to Wongawilli in the south. The conservation area is managed by the NSW National Parks & Wildlife Service.

Flora and fauna
Flora on the mountain includes blackwood, native peach, bastard rosewood, native cucumber, sandpaper fig, Moreton Bay fig, native ginger, native raspberries and hibiscus. Locally rare species include white beech and Bangalow palm.

Fauna on the mountain includes swamp wallabies, deer, spotted-tailed quolls, southern brown bandicoots, grey-headed flying foxes, sugar gliders, wombats, possums, giant burrowing frogs, red-crowned toadlets, striped marsh frogs, eastern water dragons, water skinks, blue-tongued lizards, diamond pythons, red-bellied black snakes, golden-crowned snakes and broad-headed snakes, although it is not common to see snakes, as some sources state incorrectly. Common birds are lyrebirds, spotted turtle doves, kookaburras, satin bower birds, superb blue wrens, crimson rosellas, king parrots, white-headed pigeons, brown cuckoo-doves, silvereyes, eastern yellow robins, rainbow lorikeets, little wattlebirds, grey and pied butcherbirds, yellow-tailed black cockatoos, golden whistlers, topknot ("flocker") pigeons, wonga pigeons, Australian magpies, pied currawongs, Australian ravens, noisy miners, honeyeaters (Lewin's, New Holland, spinebill, yellow-faced) eastern whipbirds, white-browed scrub wrens, rufous fantails, red-browed finches, and welcome swallows. In 1804 a logrunner bird was collected on Mount Kembla, this being the first to be scientifically described, although it is not common to see logrunners, or brush turkeys as some sources incorrectly state.

The European and scientific discovery of the koala in Australia was made at Mount Kembla and took place between June–August 1803 and involved type specimens collected and brought into Sydney in August 1803 where they were immediately figured by botanical draughtsman Ferdinand Bauer (1760–1826) and described by noted botanist Robert Brown (1773–1858). Koalas disappeared from the area probably during a subsequent gradual period of time due to the effect of clearing of forest in the habitat by settlers—however they were noticeably absent after a great fire of 1909 swept the Cordeax Valley and Mount Kembla area. The last report of suspected koala activity was in 1919 in the Cordeaux area.

Walking tracks
The Mount Kembla Ring Track follows a course around the mountain starting from the Kembla Lookout carpark on Cordeaux Road. It goes down some stone steps into a gully that flows down into Dapto Creek and then goes along the southern side of the mountain through palm and fern growth before turning at a junction. At this junction there is one of two pit pony watering holes on the east side of the mountain. The right turnoff goes into private property on Farmborough Road, but the left goes north to the second watering hole and a mine entrance. Another deviation on this side goes to another mine entrance, both are closed due to tunnel collapse risk. From here it goes through more open canopied Sclerophyll growth before coming out at Cordeaux Road near private property, though the track is legal for walking as long as within this marked section one does not deviate from the track itself. To complete the walk one must go up the road back to the lookout. This is generally done as described in an anti-clockwise fashion. Deer and wallabies are a not uncommon sight, with occasional snakes and feral goats seen.

The Mount Kembla Summit Track goes along the same small stretch of dry bush that begins the Ring Track but then branches to the left after a map/information stand. It climbs gradually up the summit ridge and on to the two summit plateaus, one by one, before going along the second to the trigonometry station.

The plateaus are both thin and go in an east–west direction along the ridge. The track is signposted near the beginning warning of 'crumbling edges' but is also known for being saved from weathering and allowing easy access to the top. Beside this track to the left (north) is an old carriageway built but not completed, after finding large sandstone boulders at the top, in the late 19th century. It is still clear though overgrown. Halfway along this track there are several rock outcrop lookouts where good views south and west can be seen, the summit offering views northeast to southeast. Lyrebirds are often seen as well as pigeons and occasional wild turkeys.

A former bridle track, the now somewhat overgrown after a while track that starts on the west side of the Cordeaux Road carpark at the Kembla Lookout is known as the Bridle Track on most maps. It goes along the escarpment, just below the edge, and can be quite slippery in moist conditions, several stages requiring jumping from rock to rock, however for the most part it is accessible if careful. The track goes through Illawarra rainforest with Lyrebirds quite common as well as swamp wallabies. The track used to go all the way to the Unanderra - Moss Vale railway line but is now overgrown beyond several hundred metres or so.

See also

 List of mountains in New South Wales
 Mount Keira
 Dendrobium

Footnotes

References

External links

Account of 1902 explosion and list of deceased
Mt Kembla Mining Heritage Inc and Heritage Festival Official site
 Coalfaces Project by Darian Zam
Wollongong City Council
Stuart Piggin : Mount Kembla Mine Disaster research materials

Geography of Wollongong
Suburbs of Wollongong
Illawarra escarpment
Mining disasters in Australia
Mining towns in New South Wales
1902 in Australia
1902 mining disasters
Coal mining disasters in Australia
Kembla
1902 disasters in Australia
Shale oil towns in New South Wales